The Coastal Cup is a trophy and soccer competition among the USL Championship (USL) teams based in Florida. Established in 2010, the trophy was originally awarded to the best team in regular season play among Florida-based franchises. Head-to-head playoff games, U.S. Open Cup matches and friendlies have no bearing on the outcome of this competition. The Fort Lauderdale Strikers did not field a team in 2017 and were later dissolved. The Tampa Bay Rowdies also participated in this cup from 2010 though 2016, before leaving the NASL for the USL.  With Miami FC joining the USL, the competition restarted in 2020.

Pre-history
The idea of an all-Florida Cup in soccer goes back to the Tang sponsored, Florida Cup in the American Soccer League. It was contested in the 1988 ASL season between the second incarnation of the Fort Lauderdale Strikers, the Miami Sharks, the Orlando Lions, and the original Tampa Bay Rowdies. In a runaway, Fort Lauderdale won the title with a total of 24 points, outpacing Orlando and Tampa Bay by 12 points and Miami by 18. They clinched the title with a month left to play in the season. They were awarded the Tang trophy on August 3 at Lockhart Stadium during halftime of their match versus Miami. Although there were at least two Florida-based clubs in the ASL (and its successor, the American Professional Soccer League) through the 1993 season, the 1988 edition was the only time in that era of Florida professional club soccer that a trophy competition of this nature was contested.

History
The Coastal Cup was first contested in 2010 as part of the fifth incarnation of the Florida Derby, between FC Tampa Bay and the original Miami FC Blues, while both were members of the D2 Pro League. Within two years time both teams would re-brand using the names of the historic NASL clubs from the two regions of Florida and were themselves part of the new NASL.

Tampa Bay won the first four Coastal Cups, with the Fort Lauderdale Strikers finally breaking through in 2014. The addition of the Jacksonville Armada to the NASL for the 2015 season made the Coastal Cup a triangular competition. The Strikers retained the trophy in 2015 with one match to spare by virtue of Jacksonville's 2–0 upset victory over the Rowdies on September 26. In the 2016 season the new Miami FC squad joined the NASL to make the competition a four-team affair. Shortly after Tampa Bay secured its fifth cup title, the franchise announced it would be leaving the NASL for the United Soccer League beginning in 2017. Although Jacksonville and Miami both participated in the 2017 NASL season, with Miami FC sweeping all five head-to-head matches, the Coastal Cup trophy was not presented to them. Miami FC joined Tampa Bay in the USL Championship in 2020 to revive this all-Florida in-league rivalry, but the trophy still has not resurfaced.

Most recent 

Tiebreaker sequence: 1. Goal Differential - 2. Total Goals - 3. Head-To-Head Record - 4. Away Goal Difference - 5. Away Goals Scored

By season 

*Although these were NASL regular season games the Coastal Cup was not presented in 2017, or since in the USL Championship

#Tampa Bay wins on away goals, 2-1.

All-time 
 *totals through 2021 season

References 

Soccer cup competitions in the United States
Soccer rivalries in the United States
Soccer clubs in Florida
Sports in Fort Lauderdale, Florida
Sports competitions in Jacksonville, Florida
Sports in St. Petersburg, Florida
Fort Lauderdale Strikers
Jacksonville Armada FC
Tampa Bay Rowdies
2010 establishments in Florida
Miami FC
Sports in Miami
Sports rivalries in Florida